Mandy Emmrich (born 15 March 1980) is a retired German rower who competed at international level events. She was a former World silver medalist in both senior and junior levels in the women's lightweight fours.

References

1980 births
Living people
Rowers from Dresden
German female rowers
World Rowing Championships medalists for Germany